Cuddalore taluk is a taluk of Cuddalore district of the Indian state of Tamil Nadu. The headquarters of the taluk is the town of Cuddalore.

Demographics
According to the 2011 census, the taluk of Cuddalore had a population of 426,017 with 212,878 males and 213,139 females. There were 1,001 women for every 1,000 men. The taluk had a literacy rate of 74.52%. Population below the age of 6 was 21,233 males and 19,770 females.

Revenue Villages
There are 84 revenue villages present under Cuddalore taluk.

References 

Taluks of Cuddalore district